Equisetum (horsetail, snake grass, puzzlegrass) is the only living genus in Equisetaceae, a family of vascular plants, which reproduce by spores rather than seeds.

Equisetum is a "living fossil", the only living genus of the entire subclass Equisetidae, which for over 100 million years was much more diverse and dominated the understorey of late Paleozoic forests. The genus Calamites of the family Calamitaceae, for example, is abundant in coal deposits from the Carboniferous period. The pattern of spacing of nodes in horsetails, wherein those toward the apex of the shoot are increasingly close together, is said to have inspired John Napier to invent logarithms. Modern horsetails first appeared during the Jurassic period.

A superficially similar but entirely unrelated flowering plant genus, mare's tail (Hippuris), is occasionally referred to as "horsetail", and adding to confusion, the name "mare's tail" is sometimes applied to Equisetum.

Despite centuries of use in traditional medicine, there is no evidence that Equisetum has any medicinal properties.

Etymology

The name "horsetail", often used for the entire group, arose because the branched species somewhat resemble a horse's tail. Similarly, the scientific name Equisetum is derived from the Latin  ('horse') +  ('bristle').

Other names include candock for branching species, and snake grass or scouring-rush for unbranched or sparsely branched species. The latter name refers to the rush-like appearance of the plants and to the fact that the stems are coated with abrasive silicates, making them useful for scouring (cleaning) metal items such as cooking pots or drinking mugs, particularly those made of tin. E. hyemale, rough horsetail, is still boiled and then dried in Japan to be used for the final polishing process on woodcraft to produce a smooth finish.

Description

Equisetum leaves are greatly reduced and usually non-photosynthetic. They contain a single, non-branching vascular trace, which is the defining feature of microphylls. However, it has recently been recognised that horsetail microphylls are probably not ancestral as in lycophytes (clubmosses and relatives), but rather derived adaptations, evolved by reduction of megaphylls.

The leaves of horsetails are arranged in whorls fused into nodal sheaths. The stems are usually green and photosynthetic, and are distinctive in being hollow, jointed and ridged (with sometimes 3 but usually 6–40 ridges). There may or may not be whorls of branches at the nodes. Unusually, the branches often emerge below the leaves in an internode, and grow from buds between their bases.

Spores
The spores are borne under sporangiophores in strobili, cone-like structures at the tips of some of the stems. In many species the cone-bearing shoots are unbranched, and in some (e.g. E. arvense, field horsetail) they are non-photosynthetic, produced early in spring. In some other species (e.g. E. palustre, marsh horsetail) they are very similar to sterile shoots, photosynthetic and with whorls of branches.

Horsetails are mostly homosporous, though in the field horsetail, smaller spores give rise to male prothalli. The spores have four elaters that act as moisture-sensitive springs, assisting spore dispersal through crawling and hopping motions after the sporangia have split open longitudinally.

Equisetum cell walls 
The crude cell extracts of all Equisetum species tested contain mixed-linkage glucan : Xyloglucan endotransglucosylase (MXE) activity. This is a novel enzyme and is not known to occur in any other plants. In addition, the cell walls of all Equisetum species tested contain mixed-linkage glucan (MLG), a polysaccharide which, until recently, was thought to be confined to the Poales. The evolutionary distance between Equisetum and the Poales suggests that each evolved MLG independently. The presence of MXE activity in Equisetum suggests that they have evolved MLG along with some mechanism of cell wall modification. Non-Equisetum land plants tested lack detectable MXE activity. An observed negative correlation between XET activity and cell age led to the suggestion that XET may be catalysing endotransglycosylation in controlled wall-loosening during cell expansion. The lack of MXE in the Poales suggests that there it must play some other, currently unknown, role. Due to the correlation between MXE activity and cell age, MXE has been proposed to promote the cessation of cell expansion.

Taxonomy

Species
The living members of the genus Equisetum are divided into three distinct lineages, which are usually treated as subgenera. The name of the type subgenus, Equisetum, means "horse hair" in Latin, while the name of the other large subgenus, Hippochaete, means "horse hair" in Greek. Hybrids are common, but hybridization has only been recorded between members of the same subgenus.  While plants of subgenus Equisetum are usually referred to as horsetails, those of subgenus Hippochaete are often called scouring rushes, especially when unbranched.

Two Equisetum plants are sold commercially under the names Equisetum japonicum (barred horsetail) and Equisetum camtschatcense (Kamchatka horsetail). These are both types of E. hyemale var. hyemale, although they may also be listed as separate varieties of E. hyemale.

Evolutionary history 
The oldest remains of modern horsetails of the genus Equisetum first appear in the Early Jurassic, represented by Equisetum dimorphum from the Early Jurassic of Patagonia and Equisetum laterale from the Early-Middle Jurassic of Australia. Silicified remains of Equisetum thermale from the Late Jurassic of Argentina exhibit all the morphological characters of modern members of the genus. The estimated split between Equisetum bogotense and all other living Equisetum is estimated to have occurred no later than the Early Jurassic.

Subgenus Paramochaete
  – Andean horsetail; upland South America up to Costa Rica; includes E. rinihuense, sometimes treated as a separate species. Previously included in subg. Equisetum, but Christenhusz et al. (2019) transfer this here, as E. bogotense appears to be sister to the remaining species in the genus.

Subgenus Equisetum
  – field horsetail, common horsetail or mare's tail; circumboreal down through temperate zones
  – Himalayan horsetail; Himalayan India and China and adjacent nations above about 1500 feet (450 m)
  – water horsetail; circumboreal down through temperate zones
  – marsh horsetail; circumboreal down through temperate zones
  – meadow horsetail, shade horsetail, shady horsetail; circumboreal except for tundra down through cool temperate zones
  – wood horsetail; circumboreal down through cool temperate zones, more restricted in east Asia
  – great horsetail, northern giant horsetail; Europe to Asia Minor and north Africa, also west coast of North America. The North American subspecies  may be treated as a separate species

Subgenus Hippochaete
  - Yukon, Northwest Territories, Nunavut and possibly North Slope of Alaska.
  – southern giant horsetail or giant horsetail; temperate to tropical South America and Central America north to southern Mexico
  – rough horsetail, rough scouring rush; most of non-tropical northern hemisphere. The North American subspecies  may be treated as a separate species 
  – smooth horsetail, smooth scouring rush; western 3/4 of North America down into northwestern Mexico; also sometimes known as Equisetum kansanum
  – Mexican giant horsetail; from central Mexico south to Peru
  (including E. debile) – branched horsetail; Asia, Europe, Africa, southwest Pacific islands
  – dwarf horsetail, dwarf scouring rush; northern (cool temperate) zones worldwide
  – variegated horsetail, variegated scouring rush; northern (cool temperate) zones worldwide, except for northeasternmost Asia

Unplaced to subgenus
Equisetum dimorphum – Early Jurassic, Argentina
Equisetum laterale – Early to Middle Jurassic, Australia
Equisetum thermale – Middle to Late Jurassic, Argentina
Equisetum similkamense - Ypresian, British Columbia

Named hybrids

Hybrids between species in subgenus Equisetum
 Equisetum × bowmanii  (Equisetum sylvaticum × Equisetum telmateia)
 Equisetum × dycei  (Equisetum fluviatile × Equisetum palustre)
 Equisetum × font-queri  (Equisetum palustre × Equisetum telmateia)
 Equisetum × litorale  (Equisetum arvense × Equisetum fluviatile)
 Equisetum × mchaffieae  (Equisetum fluviatile × Equisetum pratense)
 Equisetum × mildeanum  (Equisetum pratense × Equisetum sylvaticum)
 Equisetum × robertsii  (Equisetum arvense × Equisetum telmateia)
 Equisetum × rothmaleri  (Equisetum arvense × Equisetum palustre)
 Equisetum × willmotii  (Equisetum fluviatile × Equisetum telmateia)

Hybrids between species in subgenus Hippochaete
 Equisetum × ferrissii  (Equisetum hyemale × Equisetum laevigatum)
 Equisetum × moorei  (Equisetum hyemale × Equisetum ramosissimum)
 Equisetum × nelsonii  (Equisetum laevigatum × Equisetum variegatum)
 Equisetum × schaffneri  (Equisetum giganteum × Equisetum myriochaetum)
 Equisetum × trachyodon  (Equisetum hyemale × Equisetum variegatum)

Phylogeny

Distribution and ecology
The genus Equisetum as a whole, while concentrated in the non-tropical northern hemisphere, is near-cosmopolitan, being absent only from Antarctica, though they are not known to be native to Australia, New Zealand nor the islands of the Pacific. They are most common in northern North America (Canada and the northernmost United States), where the genus is represented by nine species (E. arvense, E. fluviatile, E. hyemale, E. laevigatum, E. palustre, E. pratense, E. scirpoides, E. sylvaticum''', and E. variegatum). Only four (E. bogotense, E. giganteum, E. myriochaetum, and E. ramosissimum) of the fifteen species are known to be native south of the Equator. They are perennial plants, herbaceous and dying back in winter as most temperate species, or evergreen as most tropical species and the temperate species E. hyemale (rough horsetail), E. ramosissimum (branched horsetail), E. scirpoides (dwarf horsetail) and E. variegatum (variegated horsetail).

One species, Equisetum fluviatile, is an emergent aquatic, rooted in water with shoots growing into the air. The stalks arise from rhizomes that are deep underground and difficult to dig out. Field horsetail (E. arvense) can be a nuisance weed, readily regrowing from the rhizome after being pulled out. It is unaffected by many herbicides designed to kill seed plants. Since the stems have a waxy coat, the plant is resistant to contact weedkillers like glyphosate. However, as E. arvense prefers an acid soil, lime may be used to assist in eradication efforts to bring the soil pH to 7 or 8. Members of the genus have been declared noxious weeds in Australia and in the US state of Oregon.

All the Equisetum are classed as "unwanted organisms" in New Zealand and are listed on the National Pest Plant Accord.

Consumption
People have regularly consumed horsetails. For example, the fertile stems bearing strobili of some species are cooked and eaten like asparagus (a dish called  in Japan). Native Americans in the Pacific Northwest eat the young shoots of this plant raw. The young plants are eaten cooked or raw, but considerable care must be taken.

If eaten over a long enough period of time, some species of horsetail can be poisonous to grazing animals, including horses. The toxicity appears to be due to thiaminase, which can cause thiamin (vitamin B1) deficiency.Equisetum species may have been a common food for herbivorous dinosaurs.  With studies showing silicate within hadrosaur teeth and that horsetails are nutritionally of high quality, it is assumed that horsetails were an important component of herbivorous dinosaur diets.

Folk medicine and safety concerns
Extracts and other preparations of E. arvense have served as herbal remedies, with records dating over centuries. In 2009, the European Food Safety Authority concluded there was no evidence for the supposed health effects of E. arvense, such as for invigoration, weight control, skincare, hair health or bone health. , there is insufficient scientific evidence for its effectiveness as a medicine to treat any human condition.E. arvense'' contains thiaminase, which metabolizes the B vitamin, thiamine, potentially causing thiamine deficiency and associated liver damage, if taken chronically. Horsetail might produce a diuretic effect. Further, its safety for oral consumption has not been sufficiently evaluated and it may be toxic, especially to children and pregnant women.

See also
 List of plants poisonous to equines

References

Further reading

External links

 Equisetum at the Tree of Life Web Project
 National Collection of Equisetum
 International Equisetological Association
 

 
Fern genera
Medicinal plants
Extant Middle Jurassic first appearances
Callovian first appearances
Callovian genus first appearances
Taxa named by Carl Linnaeus